The 1981 Bahraini coup d'état attempt was a failed coup d'état which was orchestrated by the Islamic Front for the Liberation of Bahrain which operated with alleged backing from Iran. The Bahraini Ministry of Interior arrested 73 individuals who were accused of attempting to overthrow the Bahraini monarchy and install an Islamic republic similar to that in Iran. The plot is viewed as being the first overt attempt at undermining a Persian Gulf government with some measure of Iranian aid. The Iranian government denied involvement.

Coup attempt
The coup was orchestrated by 73 individuals of various nationalities including 60 Bahrainis, 11 Saudis, a Kuwaiti, and an Omani. The Bahrainis had Shia-associated last names. The individuals had been trained in Iran, had automatic weapons, and some had Bahraini police uniforms, allegedly made in Iran. Iran denied all involvement. According to the government of Bahrain, an Iranian had brought two radios into Bahrain to be used by the plotters. The individuals planned to attack the Bahraini government offices Dar Al Hukuma and take ministers as hostages while simultaneously taking over the national radio building and television stations on December 16th; a date which marks Bahrain's national day. Three of the plotters were given life sentences, while the remaining 70 received lighter jail terms.

Reaction
The Bahraini government expelled a number of Iranian diplomats shortly after the arrests. The expulsions included Iranian diplomat Hassan Shushtari Zadeh, the top Iranian diplomat in Bahrain at that time.

See also
1990s uprising in Bahrain
2011 Bahraini uprising
Islamic Action Society
Islamic Front for the Liberation of Bahrain
Politics of Bahrain
Bahrain–Iran relations

References and notes

External links
The Role of Iran in the Failed Coup of 1981: The IFLB in Bahrain from The Middle East Journal

Conflicts in 1981
Politics of Bahrain
1981 in Bahrain
1980s coups d'état and coup attempts
Coup d'état attempts in Asia
Bahrain–Iran relations